Pavetta capensis, the Cape bride's bush, is a species of plant that was first described by Martinus Houttuyn, and given its current name by Cornelis Eliza Bertus Bremekamp. Pavetta capensis is part of the genus Pavetta and the family Rubiaceae.

References 

capensis
Taxa named by Martinus Houttuyn